Adva Reichman is an Israeli writer and director based in Los Angeles, California. She is best known for her work on the short films Silhouette and Something To Live For.

Life and career
Reichman was born in Ra'anana, Israel. Between 2013 and 2015 she worked in the Israeli media. She holds a BFA from the IDC Herzliya in Israel and an MFA in film and TV production from the USC School of Cinematic Arts in California. In 2019, Reichman directed the short film, Something to Live For, about the Israeli-Palestinian conflict. The film was screened at the LA Shorts Fest, Urbanworld Film Festival, and Taormina Film Fest. In 2018, Reichman co-wrote the feature film, Samir, a current adaptation to the Count of Monte Cristo.

Adva's feature script, Project Fog, was a semi-finalist in the 2020 Academy Nicholl Fellowships in Screenwriting and a Flickers' Rhode Island International Film Festival winner.

Filmography

Awards and nominations

References

External links
 
 

Living people
Israeli female screenwriters
Israeli film directors
Israeli women film directors
Year of birth missing (living people)